Salesi Manu (born 26 September 1990) is an Australian rugby union footballer who plays as a prop. He plays for Brisbane City in the National Rugby Championship and Bond University in the Queensland Premiership. He has previously played for Super Rugby team the Western Force, Italian club Benetton Treviso, and Japanese club Honda Heat.

Early life
Manu was a member of the Australia under 20 team that competed in the 2010 IRB Junior World Championship.

Career
He joined the Western Force Extended Playing Squad during 2012 and made 8 appearances. Manu was a member of the Western Force extended player group for the 2013 Super Rugby season before signing with Benetton Treviso for the 2014–15 season.

References

External links 
Salesi Manu itsrugby.co.uk Player Statistics

1990 births
Australian rugby union players
Australian sportspeople of Tongan descent
Western Force players
North Harbour rugby union players
Benetton Rugby players
Mie Honda Heat players
Rugby union props
Rugby union players from Sydney
Living people
Expatriate rugby union players in Italy
Expatriate rugby union players in Japan
Australian expatriate rugby union players
Australian expatriate sportspeople in Italy
Australian expatriate sportspeople in Japan